German Caribbeans are people who live in the Caribbean, but come from Germany, or are descended from Germans. German Caribbeans include:

German Haitians
Germans in Jamaica
German immigration to Puerto Rico

See also
 German interest in the Caribbean for German government policies
 Ernst Thälmann Island for a presumable German possession in the Caribbean

 
Ethnic groups in the Caribbean